Tieluohan or Tie Luo Han (pronounced ) is one of the Four Great Oolongs and a light Wuyi tea. Tieluohan is the cultivar responsible for one of the four best known Yán chá, "rock teas" grown on cliffs in the Wuyi Mountains in northern Fujian Province, China. Legend tells that this tea was created by a powerful warrior monk with golden-bronze skin, hence the name Tieluohan, which means "Iron Arhat" or "Iron Warrior Monk".

The color of the leaf is an intense green and the resulting tea is of a lighter color. The taste of the tea should be full-bodied and supple, with gentle floral notes and the traditional long-lasting finish.

See also
 Four Great Oolongs (Si Da Ming Cong)

Wuyi tea
Oolong tea
Chinese teas
Chinese tea grown in Fujian